Sagallo  was a short-lived settlement established in 1889 by a Russian monk and adventurer on the Gulf of Tadjoura in French Somaliland (modern-day Djibouti).

History
Sagallo was originally a small coastal village. During antiquity Sagallo was part of the city-states that in engaged in a lucrative trade network connecting the merchants with Phoenicia, Ptolemaic Egypt, Greece, Parthian Persia, Saba, Nabataea, and the Roman Empire.

French rule
  The Ottoman Empire had control over the area from the sixteenth to the nineteenth century. From 1862 until 1894, the land to the north of the Gulf of Tadjoura was called Obock and ruled by Somali and Afar Sultans, local authorities with whom France signed various treaties between 1883 and 1887 to gain a foothold in the region. In 1894, Léonce Lagarde established a permanent French administration in the city of Djibouti and named the region Côte française des Somalis (French Somaliland), a name which continued until 1967.

Achinov settlement

In 1883, Nikolai Ivanovich Achinov, an adventurer and burgess of Penza (b. 1856) visited Abyssinia (the Ethiopian Empire) in order to establish clerical and political ties between the two countries. After his return to Russia, Achinov voiced his plans for an 1888 expedition to the Gulf of Tadjoura to establish a settlement, while claiming to be a free Cossack. Achinov assured the participants that the sultan of Tadjoura, Mohammed Loitah, had permanently leased him land in the region. It was purely on his own initiative, and without the involvement of the Russian government, that on 10 December 1888, Achinov along with 165 Terek Cossacks boarded the Kornilov, a ship heading from Odessa to Alexandria. The expedition then boarded the Lazarev which brought them to Port Said. There, Achinov rented the Austrian ship Amfitrida, which entered the Gulf of Tadjoura on 6 January 1889. The expedition was greeted by a group of Ethiopian priests. Achinov struggled to keep the Cossacks under his control, but some raided the Danakil, stealing a cow and a sheep after driving off the local tribesmen with rifle fire. The sultan accepted 60 francs from Achimov as reparations. The French foreign office demanded an explanation of Achinov's actions and the Russian ambassador in Paris distanced the Russian Empire from him. On January 14, the abandoned Egyptian fort of Sagallo was chosen as the new base of the expedition. Achinov named the fort New Moscow. A tent was erected to serve as the church of St. Nicholas and a flag of the expedition was raised. 
Rumours about the formidable size of the expedition quickly spread through the press.
Later, several colonists escaped to Obock, informing the French of the settlement's whereabouts. On 5 February, the Cossacks noticed a French cruiser and three French gunboats. An ultimatum was issued, but Achinov misunderstood it and did not surrender. The artillery barrage that followed came as a complete surprise for the Russians, leaving 6 colonists dead and 22 wounded. A white shirt was raised to show surrender. The Russian government disavowed Achinov, accusing him of disobedience to the Tsar and acts of piracy. Participants were arrested and deported to Odessa aboard the Zabiyaka.

Climate

See also
 Afro-Russians
 Russian colonialism
 Scramble for Africa

References

Further reading

 Harding, Les. Dead Countries of the Nineteenth and Twentieth Centuries. The Scarecrow Press, 1998. 
 Jean Robert Constantin (comte de), L'archimandrite Païsi et l'ataman Achinoff: une expédition religieuse en Abyssinie. Librairie de la Nouvelle Revue, 1891. 
 French Somali Coast 1708–1946, schudak.de (without date).

History of Djibouti
European colonisation in Africa
Former colonies in Africa
Former Russian colonies
Russian Empire
1889 in Africa
Gulf of Aden
Tadjourah Region
French Somaliland
France–Russia relations
Djibouti–Russia relations